Doc McStuffins is an American educational computer-animated children's television series created and executive produced by Chris Nee (an Irish-American who was an associate producer for international versions of Sesame Street) and produced by Brown Bag Films which aired on Disney Channel and Disney Junior from March 23, 2012, to April 18, 2020. The series centers on a girl who can "fix" toys, with help from her toy friends. It features songs written and composed by Kay Hanley and Michelle Lewis.

The series received positive reviews due to the series' concept and the main character, as well as its portrayal of African Americans (Nee stated in 2013 that Doc is African American, as proposed by Disney during her initial pitch, Nee initially only knowing she wanted a girl doctor) in a Disney series. Nee conceived the series as Cheers for preschoolers.

On November 16, 2016, Disney Junior renewed the series for a fifth season. On April 4, 2018, Lara Jill Miller, the voice of Lambie, stated that the series finale had been recorded and would premiere on April 18, 2020, ending the series’ original run after five seasons, and there were no plans for the show to have a sixth season. Since the show ended, reruns continue to air on Disney Junior both locally and globally, as well as the show itself been made available on DisneyNOW and Disney+. On February 7, 2022, it was announced that the series would be celebrating its 10th anniversary in the form of an animated musical special, which was premiered on August 26, 2022.

Premise
The series chronicles freckled, seven-year-old (eight as of 2020 despite the cancellation) Dottie "Doc" McStuffins who decides she wants to become a doctor like her mother, a pediatrician. She practices for her dream job by fixing toys and dolls.

When she activates her magic stethoscope, she can create a variety of supernatural effects, including traveling through time. Her most regular use of it in the TV series is to cause toys, dolls, and stuffed animals to come to life. They are able to move, speak, sing songs, pick up things, hear, see, and smell odors, and she can interact with them. With help from her stuffed animals: Stuffy the Dragon; Hallie the Hippo; Lambie the Lamb; and Chilly the Snowman. Doc helps toys recover, or "feel better", by giving them check-ups and diagnosing their fictional illnesses with an encyclopedia called "The Big Book of Boo Boos" and another encyclopedia called "The Big Vet Book" for her toy pets when she's a veterinarian. In season four the Big Book of Boo Boos and The Big Vet Book go hi-tech in a tablet form.

Each 11-minute episode includes original songs. During ending credits in season 1, Doc gives advice to viewers about staying healthy. Seasons 1 and 2 have the original intro for the theme song, but in season 3, the spoken line by Doc at the end of the theme song was re-recorded with Doc's new voice. In season 3 Doc opens up a veterinary clinic for fixing toy pets in addition to the regular medical services that she provides for the other toys. In season 4, Doc's Grandma reveals her own magical stethoscope and teleports her and Doc to McStuffinsville, a magical city populated by living toys, and puts Doc in charge of the McStuffinsville Hospital. In season 5, Doc and her toys put together the McStuffinsville Pet Rescue Team, where they work together to rescue pets in need, led by her plush dragon Stuffy who is a great pet vet.

Each episode focuses on Doc and her crew helping another toy in need and after each check-up gives each toy advice from anything that has happened to her or other circumstances. In some episodes, a member of Doc’s crew ended up being the toy in need and even Doc herself has been the patient with the toys caring for her in the same way she had.

Episodes

Characters

Main
 Dottie "Doc" McStuffins (voiced by Kiara Muhammad in Season 1-2 and Laya DeLeon Hayes in Season 3–5) is the main character of the series, Doc is a 7-year-old girl who likes to fix toys, dolls, and stuffed animals. She wants to be a doctor like her mother, one day. She has a magical toy stethoscope which is her form of communication with all of the toys. She is a girl with long dark brown hair tied in braided pigtails with a fashionable headband in the middle of her head. She usually wears a lab coat over a long-sleeved purple-and-white striped T-shirt and pink-colored skirt with polka-dot leggings on her legs and violet ankle socks with pink sneakers with sparkles. Her name is used for the series title. Also, her maternal grandfather has survived heart and knee replacement surgery.
 Lambie (voiced by Lara Jill Miller) is a stuffed lamb who is one of Doc's best friends. She is very sweet, likes to hug people, and is a gifted dancer who wears a pink bow with her matching tutu. Her other friends are Stuffy, Hallie, and Chilly. She may have a bit of a crush on Stuffy, seeing as she gives him the most cuddles. Lambie also idolizes Dress-Up Daisy and hopes to be a fashionista like her.
 Stuffy Philbert (voiced by Robbie Rist in the TV series and Ben Schwartz in "The Doc Files") is a stuffed blue dragon who tries to be the bravest dragon of all but does not succeed at that every time, especially with spiders which he has a fear of. He is also clumsy. He is one of Doc's friends and his other friends are Hallie, Lambie, and Chilly. His design is partially inspired by Figment from the Epcot ride Journey Into Imagination at Walt Disney World in Florida. He owns a pet dog called Squibbles who he has owned since season 3.
 Chilly (voiced by Jess Harnell) is a stuffed snowman who is a hypochondriac and does not always seem sure that he isn't a real snowman. He is sweet and one of Doc's more fearful friends. He is also friends with Lambie, Stuffy, and Hallie. Chilly wears a black top hat and a blue scarf.
 Hallie (voiced by Loretta Devine) is a stuffed purple hippo and a nurse who is Doc's assistant. She is friendly and treats Doc's patients with respect and good care. She is good friends with Doc and the other stuffed animals. She also has a Radar O'Reilly-like intuition as to what Doc needs during an exam, which she calls a "Hippo Hunch" and sometimes acts like a drill sergeant. She wears a Candy striper nurse's outfit and resembles the nurse at Doc's mother's clinic, named Hattie. She wears red glasses.

Recurring
 Donny McStuffins (voiced by Jaden Betts in Season 1-2 and Andre Robinson in Seasons 3 & 5) is Doc's four-year-old brother who usually spends most of his time playing with his toy cars and his friends. He's also a main character in the first 3 Seasons and a guest star character in Season 5. He owns the toy knight action figure named Sir Kirby, who appears in the episodes Knight Time and The Dark Knight.
 Dr. Maisha McStuffins / Mom (voiced by Kimberly Brooks (also credited as Kim and Kimberly D. Brooks in some episodes)) – She is the mother of Doc and Donny and the wife of Mr. McStuffins. She is a doctor who works at a clinic. She expects Doc to become a doctor, like herself.
 Mr. Marcus McStuffins / Dad (voiced by Gary Anthony Williams) – Mostly a stay-at-home father but indicated in the episode "The New Girl" to have a part-time job who usually cooks dinner while his wife is at work. He takes care of Doc and Donny, his children.
 April McStuffins (voiced by Dawnn Lewis) is Doc, Donny, and Maya's paternal Grandmother. It is revealed in the "Toy Hospital" series that she can also speak to toys. She created "McStuffinsville".
 Maya Alana McStuffins (voiced by Karen O' Brien) is Doc and Donny's new adopted baby sister, referred to as "Baby McStuffins" before being named.
 Emmie (voiced by Kylee Anderson) is the girl next door, Doc's soccer teammate, and best human friend.
 Alma (voiced by Amy Smith and Caitlin Carmichael) is Emmie's little sister.
 Emmie and Alma's mom (voiced by Chris Nee)
 Luca Stevens (voiced by Buddy Handleson) is Donny's best friend.
 Rudy is Emmie and Alma's terrier puppy.
 Will Wright (voiced by Jay Gragnani) is Donny's friend, who owns Riggo.
 Carlos Ortiz (voiced by Elan Garfias and Teo Briones) is Doc and Donny's neighbor who owns Star Blazer Zero.
 Henry Diloy (voiced by Curtis Harris) is Doc and Donny's neighbor who owns Aurora.
 Tisha McStuffins (voiced by China Anne McClain) is Doc and Donny's paternal cousin. She is the daughter of Marcus' older sister.
 Tobias (voiced by Tony Hale) is a Christmas Elf. He appears in "A Very McStuffins Christmas" and again in "The Doc McStuffins Christmas Special".
 Santa Claus (voiced by Jeffrey Tambor) is a beloved holiday icon. He appears in "A Very McStuffins Christmas" and "The Doc McStuffins Christmas Special".
 Katherine (voiced by Mela Lee) is Doc and Donny's babysitter neighbor who once owned Dress-Up Daisy.
 Jacob (voiced by Gunnar Sizemore) is the boy in the park, who owns Super Stuntman Steve.
 Dr. Peerless (voiced by Alexandra Ryan) is a doctor who works in the same clinic as Doctor McStuffins.
 Declan Smith (voiced by Matthew Wayne) is a shy boy who befriends Doc at the clinic.
 Hattie (voiced by Loretta Devine in Season 1-5 and Cree Summer in Season 6) is a nurse at the clinic that is like a human version of Hallie.
 Maddie (voiced by Angie Wu) is the girl in the park who owns Norton.
 Ramona Marcus (voiced by Grace Kaufman) is the owner of Dart the Unicorn. 
 Ian Sheridan (voiced by Rio Mangini) is one of Doc's neighbors who's the owner of Wildlife Will.
 Tamara (voiced by Kyla Kenedy) is one of Donny's friends who owns Southwest Sal.
 Sabrina (voiced by Raven Walker) is Doc and Donny's toddler cousin.
 Nia (voiced by Cherami Leigh) is one of the patients at Doctor Myiesha McStuffins's clinic.
 Florence Nightingale (voiced by Joanne Froggatt)
 Audrey (voiced by Trinitee Stokes)
 Dev (voiced by Julian Zane) is a seven-year-old boy who is accidentally transported to McStuffinsville and becomes the leader of the McStuffinsville's First Responders.

Toys

 Squeakers is a purple squeaky that looks a like a blowfish and can go in water like Hermie, Marvin, Surfer Girl, Melinda the Mermaid, and Lula.
 Angus (voiced by Rob Paulsen) is a Karate Kangaroo who has a fear of fighting.
 Anna (voiced by Meghan Strange) is a stuffed monkey. She, along with her brother, Ben, can stick to each other. She belongs to Doc's friend, Alma. She had to stay at Doc's house overnight while her brother was getting recovered.
 Aurora (voiced by Laraine Newman) is a telescope belonging to Henry, who speaks in 60's hippie lingo and walks on her tripod. In the episode "Starry Starry Night" her vision was strangely blurred, and Doc led a search in Henry's yard to find Aurora's missing eyepiece.
 Awesome Guy (voiced by David Boat) is a toy superhero that belongs to Donny. In the episode "Righty-on-Lefty", he had to rescue Lambie from a tree, but there was a problem with his legs. Doc wanted to give him a checkup, but he didn't want to get one, and then later Stuffy had an idea to sneak him in. Doc found out the problem: his legs were put on the wrong way. So when Doc fixed them he was back in action.
 Bella (voiced by Julianne Buescher) is a ballerina like Lambie, only she's human and wears a blue outfit and speaks in a Russian accent. She accidentally cracked her leg after a leap and had to have it put in a cast, but she found lots to do while she waited for it to heal.
 Ben (voiced by Jeffrey Nicholas Brown) is a stuffed monkey. He, along with his sister, Anna can stick to each other. He belongs to Doc's friend, Alma. He had to be fixed when his Velcro sticker ripped off and he got separated from Anna overnight.
 Big Jack (voiced by Ty Burrell in "Out of the Box" and Tom Cavanagh in "Chip Off the Ol' Box") is a jack-in-the-box, with a joker popping out when the handle turns. In the episode, "Chip Off the Ol' Box", he hurts his crank after Donny crashes into him while practicing some defensive soccer save moves.
 Boomer (voiced by Dave B. Mitchell) is the soccer ball that belongs to Emmie. He was flat due to a leak but was scared of the needle in the air pump Doc had to use.
 Boppy (voiced by James Arnold Taylor) is the blue inflatable punching bag shaped like a dog, who usually can't be knocked down. He found himself losing air after a rosebush popped him, and was taken in by Doc for patching and reinflation (This scene is used as part of each show's opening until Season 4). In The Doc Files episode "Boppy's Boo Boo" Boppy was also known as "Bobby".
 Bonnie Blue is a toy horse on wheels which Sir Kirby rides on. Bonnie Blue was also in "Dusty Bear" as Stuffy's horse when he pretended to be a Cowboy.
 Bronty (voiced by Jeffrey Nicholas Brown) is a Brontosaurus toy from the Tank Toy Grabber crane machine in which Donny won who loves to run around and to swim.
 Bubble Monkey (voiced by Hynden Walch) is a monkey that blows bubbles and belongs to Emmie and Alma. She stopped blowing bubbles when Alma accidentally filled her with paste instead of bubble soap.
 Buddy (voiced by Jess Harnell) is a dump truck toy that belongs to Donny. Buddy is Riggo's best friend. (Based on the Buddy-L line of toy trucks.)
 Carl Chug-a-Chug is a streamlined steam locomotive friction powered toy who resides in Doctor McStuffins' Clinic.
 Celeste (voiced by Kath Soucie) is a projector toy who can project the entire Solar System.
 Choo-Choo Train is a wooden toy train who is used either as an ambulance to move the smaller injured toys or as a getaway vehicle for the Wicked King.
 Commander Crush (voiced by Steve Blum) is a blue with a sky blue armor-like body and yellow outlines special transformers-like toy that turns into a spaceship until Tobias accidentally broke one of his gears. However, he is soon fixed. He considers himself "space buddies forever" with Star Blazer Zero, but was sad when Zero had to move away with his kid, Carlos. His catchphrase is "Space-tastic!".
 Curly-Q (a.k.a. Q; voiced by Cherami Leigh) is a doll who is the newest member of "The Waiting Room Toys" who didn't like her original hairstyle and wanted a new hairstyle.
 Dart (Voiced by Catherine Cavadini) is a toy Unicorn that Doc almost stumbles over causing Doc to sprain her ankle. Belongs to Ramona.
 Dolly (voiced by Alexandra Ryan) is a Fairy Princess Rag Doll who resides in Doctor McStuffins' clinic.
 Dragon-Bot (voiced by Jack Conely) is a Hi-Tech Robotic Dragon toy that belongs to Donny who Stuffy becomes jealous of because he is more "hi-tech" than him.
 Dress-Up Daisy (voiced by Amy Sedaris and Grey Griffin) is a fashion Doll that once belong to Katherine when she was Doc's age and was presumed lost after a gust of wind took her away while wearing a parachutist outfit.
 The Dude (voiced by Jess Harnell) is a stuffed snowman. In the episode "Chilly and the Dude", Chilly got jealous when he feels that The Dude is more charming and athletic than him but then learns that it's ok to be yourself.
 Fabulous Fabio (voiced by Jess Harnell) is a toy with an Italian accent that "grows" hair, which he likes to shake, using a Play-Doh type clay who resides in Doctor McStuffins' Clinic.
 Frida Fairy (voiced by Sutton Foster) is a cute toy fairy kite who thinks she's a real, magical fairy.
 Gaby (voiced by Lacey Chabert) is a toy giraffe that Doc won in the Tank Toy Grabber game at the arcade. She had a ripped leg, so when Doc fixed it, she decided to take her home.
 The Glider Brothers: Orville (voiced by Sam Riegel) and Wilbur (voiced by David Kaufman) are a pair of rubber band-powered gliders who love to fly. Wilbur once broke his rubber band that powers his propeller, and Doc fixed him.
 Glo-Bo (voiced by Jim Belushi) is a toy monster with six arms, he is a friendly toy monster with a joyful personality. Neglected for several weeks when Donny got a new train, Glo-Bo consulted Doc about his lost ability to glow in the dark. He also inadvertently spread a rash (which was really blue paint) to many toys, including Chilly.
 Gloria (voiced by Lori Alan) is a purple stuffed toy Gorilla owned by Donny who loves to laugh. Parts of her are made of leather.
 Gustave (voiced by Stephen Stanton) is a green plastic alligator with a Cajun accent and appetite for marbles. He is one of four mechanical players in Donny's game Gulpy-Gulpy Gators. Doc had to empty his stomach after Donny added extra marbles to the game and Gustave wound up overstuffed. He also once got himself stuck in a fence gate while chasing a runaway marble, and Doc and the other toys try to set him free without injuring him in the process.
 Hermie (voiced by Ari Rubin) is a toy crab that Doc, Squeakers, and Marvin can play with in the water. He once lost an arm after a rough run-in with Rudi the Puppy.
 Johnny Foosball (voiced by Josh Keaton) is a star goalie from a foosball game who keeps getting stuck.
 Kiko (voiced by Janice Kawaye) is a Japanese anime/manga doll Doc got from her Grandma. Her problem was having frail legs and being stuck in her box from her long flight from Tokyo, Japan but Doc McStuffins helped her exercise. 
 Lenny (voiced by Jeff Fischer) is a toy firetruck that belongs to Donny, he is also known as Engine 9. Donny put him in the pile of toys that he doesn't play with anymore because he didn't squirt out any water from his hose. Doc refilled him with water and returned himself to Donny.
 Leliani (voiced by Liza Del Mundo) is a solar-powered hula girl from Hawai'i.
 Lil' Egghead (a.k.a. Eggie; voiced by Peter MacNicol) is a handheld electronic learning toy. He is known as an intelligent rival to Professor Hootsburgh. In the episode, "L'il Egghead Feels the Heat", he overheats and starts malfunctioning due to the sun, so Doc fixes him.
 Little Jack (a.k.a. Little J; voiced by Brady Tutton in "Out of the Box" and "Chip Off the Ol' Box") is the son of Big Jack. He had trouble popping out from his box. He was scared to get a check-up but then wasn't scary. Then Doc found out that his clothes were stuck between the cogs of the music box. 
 Loud Louie (voiced by Georgina Cordova a.k.a. Georgie Kidder) is a toy cellphone that Doc used to play with when she was little. He was loud because he was super excited, so he had to learn to use his inside voice.
 Lula (voiced by Grey DeLisle) is a sponge toy that looks like a Beluga whale. When Lula is placed in the water it takes only a couple of hours for her to grow, and in the end, she has grown to fit in the fish tank in Doc's clinic.
 Marvin is Doc's rubber ducky who lost his squeaker at the water park. 
 Melinda (voiced by Dharbi Jens in her first two appearances and G. K. Bowes in her third appearance) is a plastic toy mermaid that was found at the kiddie pool. She had trouble swimming because her winder-upper was stuck and she didn't take swimming lessons, so when she took them, can now swim. 
 Millie the Microphone (voiced by Lisa Loeb) is Emmie's toy CD boombox. Millie kept repeating words when she spoke because her disc was dirty inside her.
 Moo Moo (voiced by Colette Whitaker) is a stuffed cow that belongs to Alma, who drags out her long u's when she speaks, so it sounds like she's actually mooing. Once she didn't want to go back to Alma after being left out in the rain.
 Morton (voiced by Jess Harnell) is a stuffed toy lion who resides in Doctor McStuffin's clinic.
 Mr. Chomp (voiced by Brad Abrell) is the plastic toy shark that belongs to Donny, who is very kindhearted and doesn't bite like a real shark.
 Norton (voiced by Tim Dadabo) is a toy wind up mouse who belongs to Maddie. He can do flips.
 Niles (voiced by Charlie Schlatter) is Donny's toy crane. He had a bandage on his crane because it was unfixable, but Niles didn't want his bandage changed because he was nervous about getting it removed, and later he was brave enough to get his old bandage removed slowly and quickly.
 Officer Pete (voiced by Michael Gough) is Donny's metal toy police car who takes his job very seriously and overheated while pursuing The Wicked King on a very hot Summer day.
 Peaches Pie (voiced by Paula Rhodes) is Alma's sweet-smelling doll who smells like peaches but was dragged outside into the rain-soaked yard by Rudy and lost her scent.
 Penny Possum (voiced by Audrey Wasilewski) is a possum who is the mother of three possum children, Pip, Flip, and Trip (all voiced by Caitlyn Leone). The children went missing when one of Penny's velcro patches ripped loose.
 Pickles (voiced by Colleen O'Shaughnessey) is a stuffed bunny that wears bows on her ears and has a heart on her chest. She was in a box at Alma's yard sale and left because she thought that she wasn't loved anymore. Later, Doc finds out that Pickles triangle nose is missing and replaces it with a button and soon Doc returns Pickles to Alma and puts her in her room. She was named "Pickles" after Alma's favorite snack which are pickles.
 Professor Hootsburgh (a.k.a. "Hootsie"; voiced by Laraine Newman) is a stuffed owl with a very smart brain who speaks in a British accent. Doc got her from her older cousin Tisha. When Tisha first gave Hootsburgh to Doc, she couldn't read properly because of her poor eyesight, so Doc gave her glasses. In the episode "Professor Pancake" she gets flattened under Doc's toy box.
 Ricardo Racecar (voiced by Ian Gomez in "Run Down Race Car", Robbie Rist in later episodes) is Donny's possibly Italian toy race car who lost energy because Donny raced him and didn't let him recharge, but when Doc's dad put him onto charge, he was soon better.
 Riggo (voiced by Dennis Farina) is a grader toy that belongs to Will. Riggo is Buddy's best friend. In the episode "Stuck Up", his scooper was stuck because there was sand on the side of his scoop, jamming his gears. But Doc didn't figure this out until she suffered a little sand in her own eye.
 Rita (voiced by Molly Shannon) is a toy Cheetah that belongs to Donny who is very fast. Unfortunately, Chilly and the other toys thought she might be sick because of her spots when they first met her.
 Robot Ray (voiced by Dee Bradley Baker) is Donny's battery-operated robot who considers himself a rescuer like Ronda, but once he finds out that he can't get wet in the episode "All Washed Up" Ray is equipped with long-range vision and a white cord he shoots out with his right hand, extending his reach. He was also at Hallie's birthday and went camping with Doc, Donny and their Dad in the episode "Out in the Wild". He broke his sticky launcher, but Doc used first-aid to fix his arm till the end of the campout.
 Rescue Ronda (voiced by Camryn Manheim) is the remote-control helicopter that belongs to Luca. Her job and passion is rescue missions and has ended up in Doc's clinic more than once with damage taken in the line of duty. If Rescue Ronda can't perform a rescue herself, she'll direct her friends on how to help. She serves as an aerial ambulance for the toy hospital.
 Rosie the Rescuer (voiced by Nika Futterman) is a toy ambulance that belongs to Emmie and Alma. She likes to rescue things but suffered from severe panic attacks. She serves as an ambulance for the toy hospital.
 Sebastian (voiced by Dee Bradley Baker) is a ghost that lives in a toy pumpkin, who was once scared of Halloween, but then Doc explains to him that it's all pretend, and then he decides to go back to his job. His sensor was also broken, making him pop out of his pumpkin, but Doc fixed it.
 Sir Kirby (voiced by Rob Paulsen) is the armoured knight action figure, who is one of Donny's toys. He often plays the hero in Doc's game "Save Princess Lambie", but not without taking some damage. He's friendly but when someone does something mean like the Wicked King being rude for instance, that's when he'll take action. Sir Kirby also has a crush on Lambie.
 Star Blazer Zero (voiced by John Michael Higgins) is a toy alien who pilots a rocket ship, his catchphrases are "Kazowie" and "Kazow". His arms and legs once fell off because he didn't have a seat belt.
 Southwest Sal (voiced by Laraine Newman) is a toy cowgirl who is a literal cow. She holds a lasso which works via a spring and belongs to Donny's pal Tamara. 
 Sproingo Boingo is a fox-shaped Slinky toy.
 Spritzy Mitzi (voiced by Angelique Perri) is an octopus-shaped water sprinkler toy that ruptured a sprinkler tentacle after getting a pebble stuck in it. She talks like a rapper and uses phrases like "poppin'" and "solid."
 Super Stuntman Steve (voiced by Mike Vaughn) is an extreme stunt motorcyclist action figure who belongs to Jacob.
 Surfer Girl (voiced by Kimberly Brooks) is a teen girl doll with her feet attached to a surfboard who speaks in Surfer Lingo.
 Susie Sunshine (voiced by Amber Hood) is a plastic toy doll that wears a pink dress and pink shoes. She was cranky because her eyes were stuck open due to some residue of a melted pineapple ice pop that was stuck on her eyebrows.
 Sydney (voiced by Steve Blum) is a Karate Kangaroo who is a partner with Angus who loves to fight.
 Teddy Bear (a.k.a. Bear; voiced by James Arnold Taylor) is a salmon-colored teddy bear from the Tank Toy grabber crane machine.
 Teddy B. (voiced by Jason Marsden) is Donny's teddy bear who was reunited but caused Donny to sneeze due to an excess of dust on his fur for being laying around and not being played with for ages.
 Tiny Tessie (voiced by Katie Leigh) is a baby doll who is always in her stroller, named the "Sleepy Slumber 2000", and has a bottle with milk in it. Since she never left her stroller, many of the other toys thought of Tessie as a real baby.
 Tremaine (voiced by Ari Rubin) is a toy truck designed by Donny. He is very dynamic and needed to stand still because he had to get his stripes repainted.
 Tug is Donny's squirt toy that is shaped like a tugboat.
 Val (voiced by Jennifer Hale) is a heart shape stuffed toy given by Doc's parents for Valentine's Day and causes a rift between her and Lambie.
 Walter and Gracie (voiced by Tom Kenny and Grey DeLisle respectively) are two walkie talkies that are both of different genders. Once, Walter lost his antenna and Gracie was lost in the strawberry field.
 Wicked King (voiced by Jess Harnell) is usually incredibly rude to the toys but he has a soft spot.
 Wildlife Will (voiced by Jeffrey Nicholas Brown) is an Australian explorer action figure who lost his legs after a run-in with a Chihuahua. 
 Xyla (voiced by Tiffany Thornton) is a toy xylophone that looks like a ladybug and belongs to Alma. In the episode "One Note Wonder" one of her keys was loose because one of the screws was loose, and when the key fell into the sink when Stuffy knocked it off, Doc replaced it with a new one.
 Witch Hazel (voiced by Lara Jill Miller) is a witch seen in the episode "Boo-Hoo to You!".
 Farmer Mack (voiced by Tom Kenny) is a toy farmer who, in "Stuffy gets his scrubs", broke his ankle.
 Lieutenant Luna 2200 (voiced by Naturi Naughton) – An astronaut with a pet mechanical dog (Space Rover) Olivia 0–197–0 a.k.a. Liv
 Saltwater Serge (voiced by Bernardo De Paula) is a water toy who once belonged to Doc's Dad in his childhood. He and his whale, Wellington wouldn't work because their button is worn out after being used a lot by Doc's Dad when he was young, so Doc fixed the button.
 Nikki Nickel (voiced by Hynden Walch) is a toy piggy bank.
 Squibbles (voiced by Dee Bradley Baker) is Stuffy's toy pet critter.
 Fetchin' Findo (voiced by Dee Bradley Baker) is a robotic puppy. He couldn't fetch his toy bone because he had sand in his electronic nose, so Doc decided to open a new Veterinarian branch to her clinic to take care of toy pets and cleaned the sand out of Findo's nose.
 Admiral Fiddlesticks (voiced by Robert Bathurst)
 Creepy Cuddly Charlie Monster (voiced by Tom Kenny) is a stuffed three eye monster who is not scary but very friendly.
 Princess Persephone (a.k.a. "Peri"; voiced by Geena Davis) is a princess.
 Count Clarence the Magnificent (voiced by Patton Oswalt) is a cardboard toy bat who thinks he could fly like a kite about good positive attitudes after he becomes grumpy from getting caught in a gust of wind and crashing into the wading pool at the park. Then, Doc uses Donny's kite to dry off Count Clarence and get him back to normal.
 Army Al (voiced by Rodger Bumpass) is a toy soldier.
 Theodore (also known as Theo) (voiced by David Kaufman) is a wind-up toy Sea Turtle.
 Rockstar Ruby (voiced by Erin Cottrell) is a used Rock Star doll that belongs to Doc. Doc purchased her from a Yard Sale. In the episode, "Rockstar Ruby and the Toys", her microphone button got stuck because dirt and gunk built up over time she was used. But Doc and the crew has a plan to bring back Rockstar Ruby back on stage.
 Kiara (voiced by Kath Soucie) is a Kaleidoscope.
 Tiny Tessie (voiced by Katie Leigh) is a toy doll who after losing a relay race, discovers that she needs to get out of her Sleepy Slumber 2000 Stroller to be active and have more fun.
 Coach Kay (voiced by Dot-Marie Jones) is a small plastic doll in a football/soccer kit.
 Tony (voiced by Chris Coppola) is a toy taxi cab driver.
 Viewy Stewie (voiced by Wayne Knight) is a viewmaster toy who can view images.
 Pop Up Paulo (voiced by Arturo Del Puerto) is a pop-up toy frog.
 Pip (voiced by Lesley Nicol)
 Bernard (voiced by Matt Milne)
 Doodle Doo (voiced by Nigel Harman)
 Get-Well Gus (voiced by Ludacris) is a flying pegasus toy. When he crashed and breaks off one of his wings, Doc outfits him with a prosthetic.
 Gillian the Giant (voiced by Maeve Higgins) is an Irish Giantess doll based on a series of storybooks.
 Lala Koala (voiced by Cristina Milizia) is the new baby toy.
 Dixie (voiced by Kat Feller)
 Pandora (voiced by Ashley Edner)
 Snuggs (voiced by Deedee Magno Hall)
 Stella (voiced by Ashley Nicole Selich) is a bike racer toy that belongs to Doc.
 Joni (voiced by Kelly Stables) is a pony. In the episode "Joni the Pony" Joni trips over her mane and the other toys suggest a haircut.
 Winnie (voiced by Jaime Pressly) is a toy tiger who is used to blow up balloons
 Tavia (voiced by Hynden Walch) is a toy otter that belongs to Lisa.
 Sadie (voiced by Michelle Cambpell) is a toy parrot that belongs to Emmie.
 The Twirly Twins: Jaz and Chaz (voiced by Chantelle Barry and Scott Whyte)
 Molly Molly (voiced by Cristine Lakin) is Doc's toy who loves to have flapjacks flipped into her mouth. When she keeps talking while eating, one of her plastic flapjacks gets stuck in her mouth, so Doc and the crew teach Molly Molly how to eat carefully and not to talk with her mouth full.
 Flora (voiced by Damienne Merlina) is a Flamenco dancing doll that Doc received as a gift from her Grandmother who was visiting Spain.
 Itty Bitty Bess (voiced by Audra McDonald) is an antique tintype airplane pilot which Doc's mom got from a flea market/swap meet. She and her airplane, Qweenie once had trouble flying due to rust. Doc used oil to get rid of the rust, and now Itty Bitty Bess can go back to flying in the Wild Blue Yonder.
 Queenie is an airplane that belongs to Itty Bitty Bess
 Dress-Up Declan (voiced by Taye Diggs) is a fashion doll that belongs to Emmie.
 Dmitri (voiced by David Copperfield) is a doll who is Donny's magician partner.
 Fiona (voiced by Amy Pemberton) is a paper doll from St. Patrick's Day.
 Stanley (voiced by Anthony Anderson) is a toy lion with parts of a toy rabbit who planned on taking over McStuffinsville.
 Twiggly (voiced by Debi Derryberry) is a toy squirrel.
 Camille (voiced by Dede Drake) is a toy camel.
 Missy (voiced by Ellen Pompeo) is a toy cat that belongs to Alma.
 Katie (voiced by Mary Faber) is a singing toy doll. She once had to recharge her battery before a performance.
 Darla (voiced by Molly Ringwald) is a toy fox who helps in emergencies at the toy hospital.
 Nurse Riley (voiced by Leslie Grossman) is a toy Rhonchus who works at the toy hospital.
 Rodriguez Foosball (voiced by Jess Harnell) is one of Johnny Foosball's teammates.
 Logan (voiced by Kailey Snider) is an ice cream truck who is the cousin of Rosie the Rescuer and who is a part of the McStuffinsville Pet Rescue Team.
 Queen Amena (Amina) (a.k.a. Sparkly Queen of the World; voiced by Lucinda Clare) – A monarch Doc receives from her cousin Tisha. Some of the other toys including The Wicked King once consider her as "bossy" but Doc objects to that label.
 Bozini the Foosball Goaltender (voiced by Jess Harnell)
 Oooey Gablooey (voiced by Mitchell Whitfield)
 Tracy (voiced by Yvette Nicole Brown) is a triceratops train.
 Chuck (voiced by David Shatraw) is a toy chicken.
 Tarantu-Lon (voiced by Rick Wasserman) is a toy robot space spider.
 Hilary (voiced by Gabourey Sidibe) is a toy mole.
 Hannah (voiced by Terra Deva) is a toy doll. She got gum stuck in her hair, so Doc got it out by cutting off her hair.
 Quackson (voiced by Mary Faber) is a toy duck.
 Rocky (voiced by Jessie Gold) is a toy porcupine.
 Nanny (voiced by Kaitlyn Robrock) is a lost toy granny nanny goat that sews.

The Logger of Lemurs Troupe
A group of lemurs who are known for their amazing skills.

 Wyatt (voiced by Derek Phillips) is a yellow male lemur who is the leader of the troupe. He discovers that he is missing an arm and decided to quit the team. Later, Doc researches that he was actually intentionally built this way at the factory.
 Trixie (voiced by Laraine Newman)
 Butch (voiced by Gary Anthony Williams)
 Calamity (voiced by Jamie Lewis)
 Otis (voiced by Jeffrey Nicholas Brown)
 Tumbleweed (voiced by Jeffrey Nicholas Brown)
 Maybelle (voiced by Lara Jill Miller)
 Cheyenne (voiced by Jamie Lewis)
 Yul (voiced by Michael Gough)
 Boots (voiced by TBA)

The First Responders Team
 Shinji (voiced by Parry Shen) is a toy firefighter who is part of the McStuffinsville's First Responders.
 Zoe (voiced by Debi Derryberry) is a toy who is part of the McStuffinsville's First Responders.
 Jacks (voiced by Will Callyer) is a toy who is part of the McStuffinsville's First Responders.
 Riggles (voiced by Alex Cazares) is a toy tyrannosaurus rex who is part of the McStuffinsville's First Responders.
 Nosh (voiced by Michael-Leon Wooley) is a toy crocodile who is part of the McStuffinsville's First Responders.
 Iggy (voiced by Laraine Newman) is a toy cat who is part of the McStuffinsville's First Responders.

Guest stars
 Winnie the Pooh (voiced by Jim Cummings)
 Tigger (voiced by Jim Cummings)
 Piglet (voiced by Travis Oates)
 Eeyore (voiced by Peter Cullen)
 Christopher Robin (voiced by Oliver Bell)
 Michelle Obama (voiced by herself)
 Audrey's mother (voiced by Robin Roberts)

Broadcast history
In the United States, Doc McStuffins first premiered on March 23, 2012, on Disney-ABC networks Disney Channel and Disney Junior. Starting March 26, the series had begun airing weekdays at 10:00 AM ET on Disney Channel and 4:00 PM ET on Disney Junior while on the weekends, it aired at 7:30 AM ET on Disney Channel and 10:00 AM ET on Disney Junior and has changed since then. On June 5, 2012, Disney Junior renewed the series for a second season, which premiered on September 6, 2013. On January 8, 2014, the series was renewed for a third season which premiered on November 2, 2014, but when the voice of Doc was changed in 2015, the episodes formerly in the third season with the former voice of Doc were put in season 2 and new episodes were released in season 3 starting July 2, 2015. On April 14, 2015, the series was renewed for a fourth season by Disney Junior, which premiered on August 5, 2016. It is titled "Doc McStuffins: Toy Hospital". On November 16, 2016, the series was renewed for a fifth season by Disney Junior, which premiered on October 26, 2018 with its first episode titled "The Pet Rescue Team!".

In Canada, the show premiered on its Disney Junior variant channel on April 8, 2012 at 10:00 AM ET with an encore at 5:30 PM ET. The show also aired globally on Disney Junior in multiple languages.

DVD releases
Home media is distributed by Walt Disney Studios Home Entertainment.

Reception 

The series received positive reviews and criticisms after its release. Kia Morgan Smith of Cincomom.com said that "It truly warmed my heart and almost brought tears to my eyes when my 8-year-old, Mikaela, saw 'Doc McStuffins' for the first time and said, 'Wow, mommy — she's brown,'" Dr. Myiesha Taylor founding president of Artemis Medical Society said that "This program featuring a little African-American girl and her family is crucial to changing the future of this nation." Taylor also applauded the concept of its portrayal of a young black girl who wishes to follow in the footsteps of her mother as a doctor as the lead character, that inspired her to collect pictures of 131 doctors — all women of color — and publish a collage online under the heading, 'We Are Doc McStuffins.'"

The program was also a ratings hit on Disney Junior, with its premiere attracting 1.08 million children ages 2 to 5 and an average of 918,000 viewers in the same demographic, leading AdWeek magazine to dub the show an "improbable ratings juggernaut".

In 2013, $500 million worth of Doc McStuffins merchandise was sold, something The New York Times writers claimed industry experts said "seems to be setting a record" for a "toy line based on an African-American character". They also said the character had broad appeal and the toys sold well to all demographics.

In 2016, news that Disney had yet to formally renew the program for a fifth season resulted in a number of celebrities, including W. Kamau Bell, Jamilah Lemieux and Audra McDonald to appeal Disney to continue the program. Chris Nee, the show's creator, tweeted that she would report immediately if she received any news of the show being picked up, commenting that the writing staff was eager to continue with new stories.

Episode featuring an interracial lesbian couple

On August 5, 2017, Season 4 Episode 22a, "The Emergency Plan", featured Thea and Edie, an interracial lesbian married couple, making Doc McStuffins the first Disney Junior preschool series and Disney's first TV series to include a same-sex couple. The characters were voiced by real life lesbian actresses Wanda Sykes (Thea) and Portia de Rossi (Edie). LGBT rights organization GLAAD expressed its support and lauded Disney for the inclusion of the characters. By contrast, it was protested by the One Million Moms division of American Family Association.

Awards and nominations
George Foster Peabody's craters were recognized by a Platinum Special Honorary Academy Award Of Merit for Record Breaking Achievement in Excellence.

Video game adaptations
Doc McStuffins Pet Vet was released on iOS and Android.

Feel Good Games
There are a variety of games specifically focused on the series, including:
 Big Air Adventure a five-series crossover of title characters from Henry Hugglemonster, Jake and the Never Land Pirates, Miles from Tomorrowland, and Sofia the First
 Doc McStuffins Sticker Book
 Doc Me
 Doc's Seek and Find
 Doc's Snowman Rollup
 Doc's Summertime Clinic
 Frost Magic
 Sparkly Ball Sports
 Stuffy's Scramble
 The Doc Mobile

Effects
In response to Doc McStuffins, an organization for medical doctors who are also women of color called the Artemis Medical Society was created on June 28, 2012.

References

External links
 
 
 

2012 American television series debuts
2012 Irish television series debuts
2020 American television series endings
2010s American animated television series
2020s American animated television series
2010s American black cartoons
2020s American black cartoons
2010s American children's television series
2020s American children's television series
2010s American LGBT-related animated television series
2020s American LGBT-related animated television series
2010s American medical television series
2020s American medical television series
American children's animated fantasy television series
American children's animated musical television series
American children's animated supernatural television series
American computer-animated television series
Disney animated television series
Disney Junior original programming
English-language television shows
Lesbian-related television shows
Peabody Award-winning television programs
Personal development television series
American preschool education television series
2010s preschool education television series
2020s preschool education television series
Sentient toys in fiction
Television series by Brown Bag Films
Television series by Disney
Animated television series about children